Ljubljana–Domžale–Ljubljana TT is an elite women's professional one-day road bicycle race held in Slovenia and is currently rated by the UCI as a 1.2 race.

Past winners

References 

Cycle races in Slovenia
Women's road bicycle races
Summer events in Slovenia